Pseudo-Abdias is the name formerly given to a collection of New Testament Apocrypha held by the Bibliothèque nationale de France and consisting of Latin translations in ten books containing several chapters. Each book describes the life of one of the Apostles.

The name "Pseudo Abdias" itself is a mistake, dating from the edition of Swiss scholar Wolfgang Lazius (1552), and based on the mention of a disciple called Abdias, who is presented as the companion of the two apostles Simon and Judas Thaddeus on the way to Persia in one of the books, Passio Simonis et Iudae (BHL H, 7749-7751).

History
In Lazius' edition (W. Lazius, Abdiae Babyloniae episcopi et apostolorum discipuli de historia certaminis apostolici libri decem Basel, 1552), the introduction to the Pseudo-Abdias is allegedly written by Sextus Julius Africanus who claimed the originals were written by Abdias of Babylon who was allegedly consecrated by Saint Simon and personally knew some of the Apostles. Abdias was supposed to have originally written them in Hebrew and Latin, after which they were translated into Ancient Greek by "Eutropius", his assistant.

The claims to the documents being genuine works of Abdias have been widely disputed for several centuries. Their original authorship was first brought into question over book six, which was associated with another assistant of Abdias called "Caton". Book six covers the lives of Saint Simon and Saint Jude. It has also been noted that a similar volume called the Pseudo-Crato was allegedly written by a disciple of Simon's called Crato.

Pseudo-Abdias was published in 1703 by Johann Albert Fabricius in the second volume of a collection he had compiled of apocryphal manuscripts. He subtitled it "Acta Apostolorum Apocrypha, sive, Historia Certaminis Apostolici adscripta Abdiae" (English: The Apocryphal Acts of the Apostles, or, the History of the Apostolic Struggle ascribed to Abdias).

The art historian Otto Demus argued that Pseudo-Abdias was a significant influence upon the designers of the mosaics of St Mark's Basilica in Venice. Meredith Parsons Lilich sees the same influence of Pseudo-Abdias in the stained glass of Reims Cathedral.

References

Christian manuscripts
New Testament apocrypha
Pseudepigraphy